The George Berry Washington Memorial is a monumental funerary sculpture located on Arkansas Highway 149 north of Earle, Arkansas. It is the only major funerary sculpture in Crittenden County, and it commemorates the life and accomplishments of the Rev. George Berry Washington (1864-1928), an African American who was probably born into slavery, but ended his life as one of the county's largest landowners. Washington's grave site is on a low mound in an open field on the east side Highway 149. Two elaborately-carved stone piers,  in height, flank wide steps leading up to the monument.

The memorial was listed on the National Register of Historic Places in 1994.

See also
National Register of Historic Places listings in Crittenden County, Arkansas

References

External links

Monuments and memorials on the National Register of Historic Places in Arkansas
Neoclassical architecture in Arkansas
Buildings and structures completed in 1928
Buildings and structures in Crittenden County, Arkansas
National Register of Historic Places in Crittenden County, Arkansas
Sculptures of angels